Arthur Keller may refer to:

Arthur C. Keller (1901–1983), pioneer of high-fidelity and stereophonic recording techniques
Arthur H. Keller (1867–1924), American painter and illustrator
Arthur I. Keller (1867–1924), United States painter and illustrator